Sphaeromitra is a genus of flies belonging to the family Lesser Dung flies.

Species
S. inepta Roháček & Marshall, 1998

References

Sphaeroceridae
Diptera of South America
Brachycera genera